"I Don't Care" is a song by American singer-songwriter and R&B recording artist Elle Varner. The song was produced by Pop & Oak, and serves as the third single from her debut studio album, Perfectly Imperfect (2012). The music video was directed by Lenny Bass.

This song features a sample from the song "Little Children" by Kool & the Gang & Sincerity by Mary J. Blige feat. DMX, Nas

Charts

References

2012 singles
2012 songs
Songs written by Pop Wansel
RCA Records singles
Songs written by Oak Felder
Elle Varner songs
Contemporary R&B ballads
Downtempo songs
2010s ballads
Songs written by Elle Varner